The 2018 Assam panchayat election were held in two phases, on 5 and 9 December 2018. The counting of votes started on 12 December and results were declared on 15 December. More than 15.6 million people were eligible to vote and voter turnout was over 78 per cent.

The Bharatiya Janata Party won 11,325 seats in total, while the Indian National Congress won 8,970 seats. Other parties won 6,489 seats.

Background
Assam Panchayat Raj Act, 1994 made provisions for establishing a three-tier Panchayati Raj system in the State at the village, intermediate and district level.

Total number of Elected Representatives and Chairpersons in the State

Election schedule
The Assam State Election Commission announced that the Polls would hold in two Phases. The polling for 
the first phase was held on 5 December 2018, while that for the second phase took place on 9 December 2018. The final counting of votes was started from 12 December 2018 in the 26 districts across the state.

In first phase, polls were held in Tinsukia, Dibrugarh, Sivasagar, Charaideo, Jorhat, Majuli, Golaghat, Nagaon, Dhemaji,
Lakhimpur, Biswanath, Sonitpur, Darrang, Morigaon, Kamrup (Metro) and Kamrup districts.
In the second phase, the election were held in Nalbari, Barpeta, Bongaigaon, Dhubri, South Salmara
Mankachar, Goalpara, Cachar, Hailakandi, Karimganj and Hojai districts

Party wise results

Zilla Parishad
The election results for 420 Zilla Parishad Members are as follows

Anchalik Panchayat 
The election results for 2,197 Anchalik Panchayat Members are as follows

Gaon Panchayat (President) 
The election results for 2,197 Gaon Panchayat Presidents are as follows

Gaon Panchayat (Ward) 
The election results for 21,970 Gaon Panchayat Wards are as follows

Overall Result

District wise results 

Legend

 Largest Party (BJP) — 17
 Largest Party (INC) — 7
 — 0
 Largest Party (AIUDF) — 1
 — 2

See also
 2021 Assam Legislative Assembly election
 2019 Indian general election in Assam

References

External links
 Assam State Election Commission
 Chief Electoral Officer, Assam

Elections in Assam
2010s in Assam
2018 elections in India
Local elections in Assam